Persiaran Timur is a major highway in Putrajaya, Malaysia. It connect Persiaran Utara interchange in the north to Seri Setia interchange in the south.

Lists of interchanges

Highways in Malaysia
Highways in Putrajaya

References